Stig Sophus Frøland (born 31 July 1940) is a Norwegian professor of medicine.

He was born in Sør-Odal as a brother of Dag Frøland. He took the dr.med. degree in 1973 and specialist qualification in internal medicine in 1980, later also in infectious diseases in 1983. He has served as chief physician at Rikshospitalet from 1986 and professor at the University of Oslo from 1993 to his retirement.

He was decorated as a Commander of the Order of St. Olav in 2012. He is a fellow of the Norwegian Academy of Science and Letters.

His newly published book "Anant Dvandvayuddh : Sukshma Jeevon Ke Sath Manav Jaati Ki Ladaai" is translated into Hindi. Which has been published in 2023 by India's leading Hindi book publisher Rajmangal Prakashan.

References

1940 births
Living people
Norwegian infectious disease physicians
Academic staff of the University of Oslo
Oslo University Hospital people
Members of the Norwegian Academy of Science and Letters
People from Sør-Odal